Vincent Brown or Browne may refer to:

 Vincent Browne (born 1944), Irish journalist and broadcaster
 Vincent Browne (sculptor) (born 1947), Irish sculptor
 Vincent Brown (historian) (born 1967), professor of history and of African and African American Studies at Harvard University
 Vincent Brown (lawyer) (1855–1904), Trinidadian lawyer
 Vincent Brown (linebacker) (born 1965), American football player and coach
 Vincent Brown (wide receiver) (born 1989), American football wide receiver
 Vincent Michael Brown (born 1971), English portrait artist
 Vincent T. Brown, community organizer and candidate in the United States House of Representatives elections in Michigan, 2010
 Vin Rock, (Vincent Brown, born 1970), American rapper